Cult of Static is the sixth studio album by American heavy metal band Static-X. It was released on March 17, 2009 via Reprise Records. The album's first single "Stingwray" was released and made available on the band's MySpace page on February 17, 2009. The album's title is a reference to the die-hard fans who have supported the band for so long. This would be Static-X's last studio album for eleven years, as well as the last to feature drummer Nick Oshiro and founding member and vocalist Wayne Static during his lifetime, though the latter's posthumously released work was included on the band's 2020 album Project: Regeneration Vol. 1. Cult of Static also marked the last time Static-X worked with John Travis, and was the band's last album on Reprise Records.

Album information 
Though "Lunatic" was the first single for the album, the song had been released on the Marvel's Punisher: War Zone soundtrack. The song was based partially on a warrior, similar to the Punisher character, and was re-recorded for the album to feature a guitar solo by Megadeth leader Dave Mustaine. The album was produced by John Travis, who also produced Static-X's previous album Cannibal.

Cult of Static continued the band's use of guitar solos and the songs feature more samples and electronic sounds than the previous album, Cannibal. "Stingwray" is available on iTunes and on Static-X's Myspace.

The band's logo on the cover artwork is the same one from Wisconsin Death Trip.

Reception 

The album debuted at #16 on the Billboard Top 200 chart and sold 19,000 copies in the United States in its first week, making it the band's highest charting album since 2001's Machine and the album received mostly positive reviews from music critics.

Track listing 
All songs written by Wayne Static, except where noted.

Personnel 
 Static-X
Wayne Static – lead vocals, rhythm guitar, production
 Koichi Fukuda – lead guitar, keyboards, programming
 Tony Campos – bass, backing vocals, vocals on "Talk Dirty to Me"
 Nick Oshiro – drums
 Dave Mustaine – first guitar solo on "Lunatic"
 Marc Jameson – keyboards

Chart positions

References 

2009 albums
Static-X albums
Reprise Records albums